Rubin Stevenson (born June 16, 1964) is a college athletics administrator and former American football coach. He is the associate athletic director at Frostburg State University, a position he has held since late 2007. Stevenson served as the head football coach at Frostburg State from 2000 to 2007, compiling a record of 31–47.

Stevenson is married to Patti Spencer Stevenson.  They were married in July, 2000 and they have two children.

Head coaching record

References

External links
 Frostburg State profile

1964 births
Living people
Frostburg State Bobcats football coaches
Salisbury Sea Gulls football players